Louisiana Hot Sauce is a brand of hot sauce manufactured in New Iberia, Louisiana  by The Original Louisiana Hot Sauce Co. which is owned by Summit Hill Foods. The product's labeling includes the word "original", and it is sometimes referred to as "Original Louisiana Hot Sauce" and "Original Louisiana Brand Hot Sauce." Bruce Foods was the previous owner and manufacturer of the brand, and sold it to Summit Hill Foods (formerly Southeastern Mills, Inc.) in April 2015.

Manufacture
Louisiana Hot Sauce is prepared using aged long cayenne peppers, which undergo the aging process for a minimum of one year. The product is among hot sauces manufactured in the "Louisiana style", whereby cooked and ground chili peppers are combined with vinegar and salt, and then left to ferment during the aging process. In 2001, over 200,000 bottles of hot sauce were manufactured daily in various sizes.

Uses
Louisiana Hot Sauce is used as a condiment to add flavor to foods, as an ingredient in some dishes, and also as a marinade for some foods, such as chicken wings.

History
Bruce Foods first marketed Louisiana Hot Sauce in 1928, and manufactured the product through April 2015. It started off as a family company, in which the sauce was prepared in the kitchen of a home and sold to neighbors. Louisiana Hot Sauce was the first sauce brand marketed using the state of Louisiana's name. The brand's slogan is "not too hot, not too mild."

In April 2015, Bruce Foods sold the Louisiana Hot Sauce brand and its assets to Summit Hill Foods, which is based in Rome, Georgia. The hot sauce continues to be made at the manufacturing plant in New Iberia, Louisiana. Louisiana Hot Sauce and other brands operated "under the company name "The Original Louisiana Hot Sauce Co.""

Distribution

See also

 Louisiana Creole cuisine
 List of condiments
 List of hot sauces

Notes

References

Further reading
 

Brand name condiments
Hot sauces
Louisiana cuisine
New Iberia, Louisiana